Elisabet Carlsson (born 9 January 1968 in Östra Göinge Municipality, Sweden) is a Swedish actress. She studied at the Swedish National Academy of Mime and Acting in Stockholm 1988–1992. She is married to the actor Stefan Roos and together they have a daughter.

Filmography
Angel (2008)
Predikanten (2007)
Isprinsessan (2007)
Järnets änglar (2007)
Beck – I Guds namn (2007)
Beck – Flickan i jordkällaren (2006)
Beck – Skarpt läge (2006)
 2005 – En decemberdröm
Four Shades of Brown (2004)
 2004 – Allt och lite till
 2002 – Dieselråttor och sjömansmöss
Grabben i graven bredvid (2002)
Woman with Birthmark (2001)

References

External links 

1968 births
Living people
Swedish film actresses